Children in Need 2014 was a campaign held in the United Kingdom to raise money for the charity Children in Need. It was the 34th such appeal, culminating in a live broadcast on BBC One and BBC Two on the evening of Friday 14 November until the early hours of Saturday 15 November. The broadcast was hosted by Sir Terry Wogan, with Tess Daly, Fearne Cotton, Rochelle Humes and Nick Grimshaw as co-hosts. Shane Richie hosted the period the show was broadcast on BBC Two. The show was broadcast from BBC Elstree Centre but also includes regular regional opt-outs. Wogan didn't present the 2015 appeal because of ill health, and later died in January 2016, making this his last one.

Telethon
The culmination of Children in Need was the live telethon broadcast on BBC One on 14 November from the BBC Elstree Centre. Viewers could donate throughout the night by telephone, online, the 'iPudsey' mobile app or at a later date from amenities such as banks or by post.

Music
S Club 7 performed a medley of their hits 'S Club Party', 'Reach', 'Bring It All Back' and 'Don't Stop Movin''
The Script performed 'Superheroes'
One Direction performed 'Steal My Girl' and 'Night Changes'
The cast of EastEnders performed a Grease medley
Rixton performed 'Wait On Me'
Donny Osmond & Laura Wright performed 'Don't Give Up'
Cheryl performed 'Only Human'
Boyzone performed 'Reach Out (I'll Be There)
Gareth Malone's All Star Choir performed a cover of 'Wake Me Up'
Susan Boyle performed a cover of 'Wish You Were Here'
The Children's Choir performed 'I'll Stand By You'

Features
Tom and Jerry: A Fundraising Adventure
The Ghosts of Ian Beale
Call the Midwife Christmas Special Preview
Doctor Who Christmas Special 
EastEnders (GreaseEnders)
Strictly Come Dancing Children In Need Special

Totals
The following are totals with the times they were announced on the televised show.

Media
This year's Children in Need song is by Gareth Malone and his All Star Choir and is a cover of the Avicii track "Wake Me Up". It was released for download on 9 November 2014.

As part of the telethon, an animated film titled Superheroes Unite for BBC Children in Need was shown. It featured the voices of Daniel Craig, Helena Bonham Carter, Abbey Clancy, Paul Hollywood, Tom Jones, and Louis Smith.

Other programmes and campaigns
In addition to the main telethon, several other BBC programmes and services have been fundraising for the appeal:

See also
 Children In Need

References

External links
 

2014 in British television
2014 in the United Kingdom
2014
November 2014 events in the United Kingdom